Rongan may refer to"

Rong'an County, in Guangxi, China
Kurun Princess Rong'an (1855-1875), daughter of the Xianfeng Emperor of the Qing Dynasty